Each "article" in this category is a collection of entries about several stamp issuers, presented in alphabetical order. The entries are formulated on the micro model and so provide summary information about all known issuers.

See the :Category:Compendium of postage stamp issuers page for details of the project.

Vaitupu 

Refer 	Tuvalu

Valona (Italian Post Office) 

Dates 	1909–1916
Currency 	40 paras = 1 piastre

Refer 	Italian Post Offices in the Turkish Empire

Van Diemen's Land 

Dates 	1853–1860
Capital 	Hobart
Currency 	12 pence = 1 shilling; 20 shillings = 1 pound

Main Article Needed  Postage stamps and postal history of Van Diemen's Land

Vancouver Island 
Dates
1865 only
Capital
Victoria
Currency
100 cents = 1 dollar
Refer
British Columbia

Vanuatu 

Dates 	1980 –
Capital 	Vila
Currency 	(1980) 100 centimes = 1 franc
		(1981) vatus

Main Article Postage stamps and postal history of Vanuatu

See also 	New Hebrides

Vathy (French Post Offices) 

Dates 	1893–1914
Currency  	French and Turkish used concurrently

Refer  	French Post Offices in the Turkish Empire

Vatican City 

Dates 	1929 –
Currency 	100 centesimi = 1 lira

Main Article Postage stamps and postal history of Vatican City

Veglia 

Dates 	1920 only
Capital 	
Currency 	100 centesimi = 1 lira

Refer 	Fiume

Venda 

One of the territories ( Bantustans ) set up by the South African government as part of its apartheid policy.
Although the territory itself did not acquire international recognition, its stamps were
valid for postage.

Dates 	1979 – 1994

Capital  Thohoyandou
	
Currency 	100 cents = 1 rand

Refer 	South African Territories

Venezia Giulia (Italian Occupation) 

Dates 	1918–1919
Currency 	Austrian and Italian used concurrently

Refer 	Italian Occupation Issues

Venezia Giulia & Istria 

Main Article Needed 

Includes 	Istria (Yugoslav Occupation);
		Venezia Giulia & Istria (Allied Military Government);
		Venezia Giulia & Istria (Yugoslav Military Government);
		Venezia Giulia & Istria (Yugoslav Occupation)

See also 	Trieste;
		Venezia Giulia (Italian Occupation)

Venezia Giulia & Istria (Allied Military Government) 

Dates 	1945–1947
Currency 	100 centesimi = 1 lira

Refer 	Venezia Giulia & Istria

See also 	Trieste

Venezia Giulia & Istria (Yugoslav Military Government) 

Dates 	1945–1947
Currency 	100 centesimi = 1 lira

Refer 	Venezia Giulia & Istria

Venezia Giulia & Istria (Yugoslav Occupation) 

Dates 	1945 only
Currency 	100 centesimi = 1 lira

Refer 	Venezia Giulia & Istria

Venezuela 

Dates 	1859 –
Capital 	Caracas
Currency 	(1859) 100 centavos = 8 reales = 1 peso
		(1879) 100 centesimos = 1 venezolano
		(1880) 100 centimos = 1 bolívar

Main Article Postage stamps and postal history of Venezuela

Victoria 

Dates 	1850–1912
Capital 	Melbourne
Currency 	12 pence = 1 shilling; 20 shillings = 1 pound

Main Article Needed 

See also 	Australia

Victoria Land 

Dates 	1911–1912
Currency 	12 pence = 1 shilling; 20 shillings = 1 pound

Refer 	New Zealand Territories

Vienna 

Refer 	United Nations (UN)

Vietcong 

Refer 	National Front for Liberation of South Vietnam

Vietnam 

Dates 	1976 –
Capital 	Hanoi
Currency 	100 xu = 1 dong

Main Article Postage stamps and postal history of Vietnam

Includes 	Vietnam (French Colony)

Vietnam (French Colony) 

Dates 	1945–1954
Capital 	Hanoi
Currency 	(1945) 100 cents = 1 piastre
		(1945) 100 xu = 10 hao = 1 dong

Refer 	Vietnam

Vilnius 

Refer 	Lithuania (German Occupation)

Virgin Islands 

Dates 	1866–1968
Capital 	Road Town
Currency 	(1866) 12 pence = 1 shilling; 20 shillings = 1 pound
		(1951) 100 cents = 1 dollar

Refer 	British Virgin Islands

Vladivostok 

Refer 	Priamur & Maritime Provinces

Volksrust 

Dates 	1902 only
Currency 	12 pence = 1 shilling; 20 shillings = 1 pound

Refer 	Transvaal

VR Special Post 

Refer 	Vryburg

VRI 

Refer 	Lydenburg;
		Orange Free State;
		Transvaal;
		Volksrust;
		Wolmaransstad

Vryburg 

Dates 	1899–1900
Currency 	12 pence = 1 shilling; 20 shillings = 1 pound

Refer 	Cape of Good Hope

See also 	Stellaland

VU(J)NA-STT 

Refer 	STT-VUJA/STT-VUJNA

References

Bibliography
 Stanley Gibbons Ltd, Europe and Colonies 1970, Stanley Gibbons Ltd, 1969
 Stanley Gibbons Ltd, various catalogues
 Stuart Rossiter & John Flower, The Stamp Atlas, W H Smith, 1989
 XLCR Stamp Finder and Collector's Dictionary, Thomas Cliffe Ltd, c.1960

External links
 AskPhil – Glossary of Stamp Collecting Terms
 Encyclopaedia of Postal History

Vai